Thomas Nikou (born June 25, 1980) is a Greek professional basketball player for Eleftheroupoli of the Greek A2 Basket League. He is a 1.85 m (6'1") tall point guard.

Professional career
After playing in the Greek minor leagues, Nikou began his pro career in the 2005–06 season, with the Greek 2nd Division club Alimos. He made his debut in the top-tier level Greek 1st Division, in the 2009–10 season, with Kavala. He joined Olympiacos' new reserve team of the Greek 2nd Division, Olympiacos B, for the 2019–20 season.

Personal life
While working as a police officer, Nikou was shot in the mouth, during a bank robbery, on 9 June 2006.

References

External links
Eurobasket.com Profile
Greek Basket League Profile 
RealGM.com Profile
ProBallers.com Profile
Θωμάς Νίκου: Ψυχή Βαθιά 
Θωμάς Νίκου: O παίκτης που ντρίμπλαρε το θάνατο 

1980 births
Living people
Diagoras Dryopideon B.C. players
Greek men's basketball players
Greek police officers
Kavala B.C. players
Near East B.C. players
Olympiacos B.C. B players
Pagrati B.C. players
Panelefsiniakos B.C. players
Sportspeople from Arta, Greece
Point guards
Psychiko B.C. players